The Prairie Band Potawatomi Indian Reservation is an Indian reservation for the Prairie Band Potawatomi Nation in Jackson County, Kansas, United States. The Potawatomi used to be located in the Great Lakes area, but were forced to move west due to Europeans settling their land. The reservation encompasses all of Lincoln Township, plus parts of Banner Township, Franklin Township, and Grant Township.

References

External links
 Official website

Anishinaabe reservations and tribal-areas in the United States
American Indian reservations in Kansas
Geography of Jackson County, Kansas
Prairie Band Potawatomi Nation